Malicious is a 1973 Italian erotic comedy-drama film co-written and directed by Salvatore Samperi. It stars Laura Antonelli, Turi Ferro and Alessandro Momo. The film is about the sexual desire of a widower and his three sons for their new housekeeper. At the Silver Ribbons awards, Antonelli and Ferro won Best Actress and Best Supporting Actor, respectively. The film was entered into the 23rd Berlin International Film Festival. A sequel, Malizia 2000, was released in 1991 with the same cast.

Plot

Following the death of his wife, a father of three sons (aged 18, 14 and 6) hires an attractive young housekeeper named Angela, and soon becomes engaged to her. His sons are also infatuated with Angela, and each of them uses their particular way to approach and capture the apparently innocent and naive young woman, and to see more of her body. But only one of them succeeds in dominating and conquering her: the middle son, the teenager Nino. He blackmails her into eventually tolerating his increasingly aggressive sexual desire. He ordered her to get naked as he chases her around the house.

Cast
 Laura Antonelli as Angela
 Turi Ferro as Ignazio
 Alessandro Momo as Nino
 Tina Aumont as Luciana
 Lilla Brignone as Granma
 Pino Caruso as Don Cirillo
 Angela Luce as Widow Corallo
 Stefano Amato as Porcello
 Gianluigi Chirizzi as Nuccio
 Grazia Di Marzà as Adelina
 Massimiliano Filoni as Enzio

Reception
The film was the most popular Italian film in Italy in 1973 with 11,756,327 admissions, the 11th most of all-time.

References

External links
 
 

1973 films
1973 comedy films
1970s coming-of-age comedy films
1970s sex comedy films
Commedia sexy all'italiana
Films directed by Salvatore Samperi
Films scored by Fred Bongusto
Films set in Sicily
Italian coming-of-age comedy films
1970s Italian-language films
Italian sex comedy films
Juvenile sexuality in films
1970s Italian films